Lewis A. Nelson is a former Northrop chief test pilot who took the T-38 on its maiden flight. He tested the F-89, N-156, the F-5 and the T-38, exceeding Mach 1 in each and also made the first flight of the YA-9A in 1972.  A recipient of two Distinguished Flying Crosses, the IAS Student Awards and four Air Medals, Nelson is a founding member and Fellow of the Society of Experimental Test Pilots.  Throughout his career, Nelson logged over 5,000 hours on a variety of aircraft.

References

External links

Airport Journals - Lew A. Nelson
City of Landcaster - Aerospace Walk of Honor 2007, Lew A. Nelson
Photo Release -- Northrop Grumman Marks 50th Anniversary of T-38 Talon First Flight
Lewis (Lew) A Nelson 1920-
Fairchild Republic A-10 Thunderbolt II (Warthog) Close Air Support / Forward Air Control - History, Specs and Pictures - Military Aircraft

Year of birth missing (living people)
Living people
American test pilots
Recipients of the Air Medal
Recipients of the Distinguished Flying Cross (United States)